The 2021 PEI Scotties Tournament of Hearts Women's Championship, the women's provincial curling championship for Prince Edward Island, was held from January 29 to 30 at the Maple Leaf Curling Club in O'Leary, Prince Edward Island. The winning Suzanne Birt rink represented Prince Edward Island at the 2021 Scotties Tournament of Hearts in Calgary, Alberta, and finished with a 4–4, just missing the championship round. The event was held in conjunction with the 2021 PEI Tankard, the provincial men's championship.

Due to the COVID-19 pandemic in Canada, many teams could not commit to the quarantine process in order to compete at the national championship. Clubmates Suzanne Birt and Darlene London were the only two teams to enter the event. Team Birt won the best of five series in just three games.

Teams
The teams are listed as follows:

Results
All draw times are listed in Atlantic Time (UTC−04:00).

Standings
Final Standings

Draw 1
Friday, January 29, 4:00 pm

Draw 2
Saturday, January 30, 11:00 am

Draw 3
Saturday, January 30, 4:00 pm

Notes

References

External links

Prince Edward Island
Curling competitions in Prince Edward Island
January 2021 sports events in Canada
2021 in Prince Edward Island
Prince County, Prince Edward Island